CKWM-FM is a Canadian radio station broadcasting from Kentville, Nova Scotia at 94.9 FM owned by the Maritime Broadcasting System. The station currently plays an adult contemporary format branded on-air as Magic 94.9.

The station began broadcasting on March 14, 1965 as CKEN-FM. From 1981 to 1988 it was a station affiliate of CBC Stereo.

References

External links
Magic 94.9

Kwm
Kwm
Kwm
Radio stations established in 1965
1965 establishments in Nova Scotia